Thomas Allen McCall (born February 14, 1956) is an American politician who was a member of the Georgia House of Representatives from 1995 until 2021. Initially elected as a Democrat, he switched parties and became a Republican prior to his 2004 reelection.

He is currently the president of the Georgia Farm Bureau.

References 

Living people
Republican Party members of the Georgia House of Representatives
Place of birth missing (living people)
21st-century American politicians
1956 births